Daniel Maier (born 1968, in Newcastle upon Tyne, England) is a comedy writer and performer for television, radio, print and the stage. He was educated at the Royal Grammar School of Newcastle upon Tyne. Between 2002 and 2012, he was part of the writing team for ITV's Bafta Award-winning Harry Hill's TV Burp. In 2010, he wrote two episodes of ITV1 soap opera Emmerdale. He has collaborated with Charlie Brooker, writing on the shows You Have Been Watching and How TV Ruined Your Life, and co-writing the comedy series A Touch of Cloth with Brooker for Sky 1 in August 2012, starring John Hannah and Suranne Jones. In 2011, Channel 4 announced it was producing a pilot of The Function Room, a sitcom written by Maier, as part of its Comedy Showcase programming strand. Other television credits include Al Murray’s Personality Disorder, The Peter Serafinowicz Show, Bafta award-winning The Sketch Show and Alistair McGowan's Big Impression.

Maier is the author of the one-act play The Unattended, performed at the 2006 Edinburgh Festival Fringe; Trapped, a series of half-hour dramas broadcast on BBC Radio 4, co-written with his brother, the stand-up comedian Mark Maier; as well as writing for and performing in BBC Radio 4 comedy shows including One, Look Away Now and Broken Arts. He has written and performed a show on Victorian polymath Francis Galton and a paper he wrote on the subject has been published in the academic journal Significance. His first book, Footypedia, was published by Century in June 2008 and his writing appeared in Faber & Faber's book Shouting At The Telly, published in November 2009. Maier is also a contributor to The Guardian, writing about television and as an occasional World of Lather columnist. Since 2008, Maier has been a resident judge at the Karaoke Circus shows, both in London and at the Edinburgh Fringe Festival.

Maier is married to author and fellow Guardian journalist Sali Hughes.

References

External links

English radio writers
English television writers
English humorists
1968 births
Living people
Writers from Newcastle upon Tyne